Gibbula turbinoides is a species of sea snail, a marine gastropod mollusk in the family Trochidae, the top snails.

Description
The size of the shell varies between 4 mm and 10 mm. The globose shell was previously thought to be a smaller variety of Gibbula adansonii. It is rose-red, yellowish, or brown, with short white flammules below the sutures. The remainder of the shell minutely punctate with white.

Distribution
This species occurs in the Mediterranean Sea and in the Atlantic Ocean off Portugal.

References

 Gofas, S.; Le Renard, J.; Bouchet, P. (2001). Mollusca, in: Costello, M.J. et al. (Ed.) (2001). European register of marine species: a check-list of the marine species in Europe and a bibliography of guides to their identification. Collection Patrimoines Naturels, 50: pp. 180–213

External links
 

turbinoides
Gastropods described in 1835